Yuan Muzhi (March 3, 1909 – January 30, 1978) was an actor and director from the Republic of China and later of the People's Republic of China.

Career 
As an actor, Yuan became extremely popular and took on the nickname "man with a thousand faces." He gained prominence in a series of films for the leftist Diantong Film Company. These included the film Plunder of Peach and Plum (1935) (which Yuan also wrote) and the movie Sons and Daughters in a Time of Storm (1935) where he was one of the two original singers (along with Gu Menghe) of the movie's theme song, The March of the Volunteers, which later became the national anthem of China.

His career eventually brought him to director's chair. Yuan's filmmaking debut, the innovative musical comedy Scenes of City Life (1935) (Dushi fengguang), was one of the earliest non-silent features made in China, as the Shanghai industry was finally transitioning to sound. The film's blend of screwball humor and romance reflected Yuan's harsh, documentary style social observations of middle class existence in the failing economy in Great Depression-era Shanghai. The father of one main character is a pawn shop owner, who in one humorous scene, is so hard up for cash himself—since no one has any money left to reclaim their pawned goods—he even attempts to pawn items from his own shop with another proprietor. The opening of the film features an extended montage of Shanghai's new, modern cityscape of the time, and its landmarks, such as neon signs, theatre marquees, and the Shanghai Cathedral. Jiang Qing, the future wife of Mao Zedong, appeared in a relatively minor role in the film. She would later lead the denunciation of many of Yuan's leftist colleagues in the Shanghai filmmaking scene, accusing them of being rightists, destroying their careers and lives.

Yuan's second film, Street Angel (1937) (Malu tianshi), starred then-unknown Zhou Xuan, who performed He Luting's popular songs written for the film, "Song of the Four Seasons" and "The Wandering Songstress", and became one of China's most adored divas for the remainder of her life. Street Angel is considered one of the most important Chinese films of all time, a highlight of the "second generation" of Chinese cinema. An experimental blend of comedy and tragedy, Yuan's story followed a group of young friends whose lack of financial means and social status frustrated their dreams of happiness, including a girl singer, her prostitute sister, and her soldier lover, home briefly between fighting the Japanese occupying north China. The film, released shortly before Japan invaded Shanghai and initiated the Second Sino-Japanese War in summer 1937, became a massive hit with audiences. Subsequently, Street Angel was seen to mark one of the last products of the "golden age of Chinese cinema" of the 1930s, before artists were forced to retreat to Shanghai's foreign concessions and finally came under Japanese propaganda control.

Yuan also continued to act in roles, notably Eight Hundred Heroes (1938) depicting the events of the Defense of Sihang Warehouse.

After the People's Republic of China was founded in 1949, Yuan continued to be a major figure in the film industry, helping to found Dongbei Film Studio, which eventually became the first state-controlled production companies in the People's Republic of China.

Yuan was a delegate to the first National People's Congress and the third Chinese People's Political Consultative Conference.

Selected filmography

Actor

Director

References

External links
 
 Yuan Muzhi from the Chinese Movie Database
 Brief biography on Yuan Muzhi

1909 births
1978 deaths
Male actors from Zhejiang
Film directors from Zhejiang
Screenwriters from Zhejiang
Singers from Zhejiang
Delegates to the 1st National People's Congress
Members of the 3rd Chinese People's Political Consultative Conference
Writers from Ningbo
People's Republic of China politicians from Zhejiang
Chinese Communist Party politicians from Zhejiang
Chinese male stage actors
Republic of China writers
People's Republic of China writers
Musicians from Ningbo
Actors from Ningbo
Politicians from Ningbo
Artists from Ningbo
20th-century Chinese male actors
20th-century Chinese  male singers
Chinese male film actors
Chinese film directors
20th-century screenwriters